Qalandariyeh (also Romanized as Qalandarīyeh) is a village in Qareh Chay Rural District, in the Central District of Saveh County, Markazi Province, Iran. At the 2006 census, its population was 36, in 6 families.

References 

Populated places in Saveh County